Belfast Waterfront is a multi-purpose conference and entertainment centre, in Belfast, Northern Ireland, designed by local architects' firm Robinson McIlwaine. The hall is located in Lanyon Place, the flagship development of the Laganside Corporation. The development is named after the architect Charles Lanyon.

Construction
Planning for the building began 1989, with the hall being completed in 1997 for the sum of £32 million. Practice partner Peter McGuckin was the project architect. The main circular Auditorium seats 2,241 and is based on the Berlin Philharmonic Hall designed by Hans Scharoun. However the flexible design of the Auditorium allows the stalls seating to be moved to create a larger arena. The smaller adjoining Studio seats 380. The dome of the building is coated in copper. This is so the exterior will eventually turn green and reflect the dome of Belfast City Hall and other Victorian buildings in the city centre. The building also contains bars and a restaurant.

Notable events

Many plays take place every year, in the 350 seated capacity studio, including operas, pantomimes, and musicals.

The hall is a key venue for the Belfast Festival at Queen's and for concerts given by the Ulster Orchestra.

During their 2002 tour, in promotion of their album Right Now, famous pop trio Atomic Kitten recorded their Right Here, Right Now DVD at the auditorium.

Planxty performed there on 19, 20 and 21 January 2005 as part of their series of reunion concerts.

In 2011 the Waterfront hosted the Sinn Féin Ardfheis, the first time for it to be held in Belfast.

On March 15, 2013, American country music singer Carrie Underwood played a concert as part of her Blown Away Tour.

On January 18, 2014 Britain's Got Talent auditions were in here. The auditions were for the Series 8 of the show. The auditions were shown on April 14, 2014.

The annual Christmas show, 'The Music Box', starring Peter Corry was hosted by the Waterfront Hall in December 2013.

Westlife lead vocalist Shane Filan played at the hall as a solo artist in 2017.

The 2018 BBC Radio 2 Folk Awards are due to take place at the Hall on 4 April. It will be the first time the awards have taken place in Belfast.

The annual snooker tournament, The Northern Ireland Open has been held at the venue since its second year in 2017.

See also 
 List of concert halls

References

External links

Official website
Belfast City Council -About Waterfront Hall
Robinson McIlwaine architects

Buildings and structures in Belfast
Concert halls in Northern Ireland
Exhibition and conference centres in Northern Ireland
Music venues in Belfast
Tourist attractions in Belfast
Buildings and structures completed in 1997
20th-century architecture in Northern Ireland